George Kinney was an American Thoroughbred racehorse best known for winning the 1883 Belmont Stakes.

Background

George Kinney was bred in Tennessee by Captain James Franklin at Kennesaw Stud. His dam was Kathleen, a daughter of the great sire Lexington, and his father was Bonnie Scotland, a great imported sire. He was sold to the Dwyer Brothers Stable, owned by Philip J. Dwyer and Michael F. Dwyer.

Racing career

As a two-year-old, George Kinney won the Flash Stakes, the Hopeful Stakes, and the Kentucky Stakes. His win at the Flash Stakes was particularly notable, as he beat his stablemate and top filly Miss Woodford.

During his three-year-old season, George Kinney won the Withers Stakes, and was the heavy favorite in the 1883 Belmont Stakes. His winning of the race was considered such a sure thing that bookmakers offered a special bet that included all of three of the other horses that would be running against him. George Kinney ended up winning the race by two lengths.

George Kinney went on to win a number of other races as a three-year-old, including the Lorillard Stakes, the Jerome Stakes, the Kenner Stakes, the Dixie Stakes, and the Grand National Handicap. He came second in Pimlico Stakes, beaten by the filly he'd previously triumphed over, Miss Woodford. He also came second in that year's Ocean Stakes, and third in the Sequel Stakes. He was beaten in the Potomac Stakes by Duke Carter, and did not place in that race.

As a four-year-old, George Kinney was starting to slow down. He came second in that year's Ocean Stakes, beaten once again by Miss Woodford. Overall, he started 38 times, won 25, placed 9 times, and came in third twice. His total career earnings were $63,875.

Pedigree

References

1880 racehorse births
Racehorses bred in Tennessee
Racehorses trained in the United States
Belmont Stakes winners